The liujiaoxian (六角弦) is a traditional Chinese bowed string instrument in the huqin family. The liujiao ((六角)) in its name literally means "six corners," and hence liujiaoxian is constructed with a hexagonal body. It is used primarily in Taiwan.

See also 
 Chinese music
 List of Chinese musical instruments
 Huqin

References

Chinese musical instruments
Culture in Hunan
Huqin family instruments
Taiwanese opera